Imtiyaz Ali Khan Khandara (1928-2018) was a painter, Marxist thinker, and art historian.

Life
Famously known as Master Sahab, Khan was born in Rampur, British India in 1928. He was one of the three sons of Fida Ali Khan. Fida Ali Khan was employed as a Tahseeldar in the erstwhile princely state of Rampur. Imtiyaz Ali Khan's paternal uncle was the legendary Vina player Wazir Khan.

Cuisine
All the Naubat Khanis were fond of good food. They were able to develop their own cuisine. Rice preparations were included in their meals and Kabab featured regularly. Rakabdars from the court of Awadh were employed in their kitchens.

Naseeruddin was a Rakabdar who was employed at the house of Imtiyaz Ali Khan. He was addressed as Peerji as he shared his name with Chiragh Dilli. This family had great respect for the Sufi saint. Peerji was an expert kababiya and he came from Awadh. His father was employed with the Nawab of Rampur.

It was said that if anyone from this family doesn't take Dessert after each meal than he is not a Naubat Khani.

The preparation at their kitchens were so rich in Ingredients that once Nawab Hamid Ali Khan said that if this family was not fond of such good food they could have houses made of Gold and silver.

Writings
Imtiyaz Ali Khan has been the editor of Musaddas Tahniyat-e- Jashn-i-Benazeer..He has also done extensive work on Mughal Miniatures.

Political career
Imtiyaz Ali Khan was associated with the Communist Party of India.

See also
Wazir Khan (Rampur)
Sadarang
Tansen
Naubat Khan
Kishangarh

References

1920s births
2018 deaths
20th-century Indian royalty
Mughal nobility
Indian Shia Muslims
Indian male painters
Indian Marxists
20th-century Indian painters
Painters from Uttar Pradesh
People from Rampur, Uttar Pradesh